Delta III was an expendable launch vehicle made by McDonnell Douglas (later acquired by Boeing). The vehicle was developed from the highly-successful Delta II to help meet the launch demand of larger satellites. The first Delta III launch was on August 26, 1998. Of its three flights, the first two were failures, and the third, though declared successful, reached the low end of its targeted orbit range and carried only a dummy (inert) payload. Under the four-digit designation system from earlier Delta rockets, the Delta III is classified as the Delta 8930.

History 
Due to the continual size and mass growth of commercial satellites in the late 1980s, McDonnell Douglas realized the need for a higher-performance rocket than even their new Delta II. New satellite bus offerings from Hughes required a launch vehicle with a 4-meter diameter payload fairing as well as the ability to send 3.5 tons of payload to a geostationary transfer orbit - neither of which Delta II offered.

Multiple options for evolving the Delta II to support larger payloads, namely using higher-performing liquid hydrogen-liquid oxygen upper stages, were considered in the late 1980s and early 1990s. Eventually, the Delta III was announced in 1995, boasting an evolved Delta II first stage and a second stage based on that of the Japanese H-II rocket. This led to Delta III being similar in size to the Delta II, meaning that the existing Delta II infrastructure at SLC-17B could be used after some modifications. Soon after the announcement, Hughes placed an order for 13 Delta III launches.

Delta III would only fly three times. The first two launches, both carrying live satellites, ended in failure. The third and final launch, carrying a dummy payload, was only partially successful after the RL-10B second-stage engine shut down prematurely. After commercial interest declined, the Delta III program was officially ended in 2003. Boeing then transitioned their focus to the new Delta IV rocket, which was much more capable than Delta III.

Multiple Delta III rockets were already built and would have been unused, but they were cannibalized for parts for both Delta II and Delta IV.

Description 
Delta III was developed from the Delta II rocket. The new vehicle sported a modified first stage and a new, more efficient upper stage. This led to Delta III having around double the payload capacity of Delta II. However, the consecutive failures of the initial Delta IIIs, combined with the more advanced Delta IV program and the continuing success of the Delta II, left the Delta III as an interim vehicle.

First stage 
Like the Delta II, the first stage of the Delta III burned kerosene and liquid oxygen and was powered by one Rocketdyne RS-27A main engine with two vernier engines for roll control. The vernier engines were also used for attitude control after the main engine shut off, just before the second stage separated. While the propellant load and gross mass of the stage were nearly identical to the Delta II, the diameter of the kerosene tank was increased from 2.4 meters to 4 meters, while its height was reduced. The liquid oxygen tank and engine section remained largely unchanged. The redesigned kerosene tank reduced the overall length of the stage and, combined with the increased height of the second stage, allowed the Delta III to use the same launch facilities as the Delta II with only minor modifications.

The first stage thrust was augmented by nine GEM-46 solid rocket boosters, sometimes referred to as GEM LDXL (Large Diameter Extended Length). These were  meters in length, 1.2 m (46 inches) in diameter, and had a mass of 19 metric tons each, about six metric tons more than the Delta II's standard GEM-40 motors. Six were ignited on the launch pad, while the remaining three were ignited just before burnout and separation of the ground-lit boosters. To maintain steering authority, three of the ground-lit boosters had vectoring nozzles. GEM-46 boosters would later find use on the Delta II, leading to the Delta II Heavy.

Delta Cryogenic Second Stage 

The second stage of the Delta III was the newly developed Delta Cryogenic Second Stage (DCSS), which burned liquid hydrogen and liquid oxygen. It was developed and manufactured partly by Mitsubishi Heavy Industries and was based on the second stage of JAXA's H-II rocket. JAXA was in charge of preliminary design, and the development of new technologies for the H-II's upper stage (and the DCSS of which it would be derived from), in which the private sector has limited competencies, while Mitsubishi Heavy Industries was responsible for manufacturing. The liquid hydrogen tank was  meters in diameter, while the separate liquid oxygen tank (attached by a truss to the bottom of the hydrogen tank) was around  meters in diameter. This stage offered significantly better performance than the Delta II's second stage, the Delta-K, which burned hypergolic propellants. The DCSS was powered by a Pratt & Whitney RL10B-2 engine, derived from the RL10 powering the Centaur upper stage but featuring electromechanical actuators for gimbal control and an extending nozzle for increased specific impulse. After Delta III's retirement, this stage design was modified for use as the Delta IV's second stage.

Control of the second stage was provided by 4 sets of hydrazine thrusters installed around the bottom of the liquid oxygen tank. During engine burns, these thrusters only provided roll control (as the engine itself could gimbal for pitch and yaw). During coast periods, these would then provide 3-axis control.

Star 48B third stage 
Delta III was offered with an optional third stage, the Star 48B solid rocket motor. It would have been attached on top of the DCSS and contained inside the payload fairing. The stage would have been used for high-energy orbits, like interplanetary missions. It was never flown on Delta III but was commonly used on Delta II missions. It has also seen use on Delta IV and Atlas V.

Payload fairing 
The payload fairing was a new composite design, matching the upper stage hydrogen tank's  diameter and allowing larger payloads than the Delta II's 9.5 or 10-foot-diameter fairing. Delta III's 4-meter fairing was derived from Delta II's 10 ft composite fairing. This fairing design would later be repurposed on the Delta IV Medium.

Launches

See also

Delta (rocket family)
Delta II
Delta IV
 Comparison of orbital launchers families

References

External links
History of the Delta Launch Vehicle
Spaceflight Now article 8/21/2000

Boeing spacecraft and space launch systems
Delta (rocket family)